I.C.B.M. is a 1981 board game published by Mayfair Games.

Gameplay
I.C.B.M. is a game that involves warfare using intercontinental missiles and ABMs.

Publication history
I.C.B.M. was designed by Neil Zimmerer and published by Mayfair Games in 1981 as one of its first releases in a line of simple simulation games that were quick to play.

Reception
William A. Barton reviewed I.C.B.M. in The Space Gamer No. 43. Barton commented that "I.C.B.M. is an impressive offering for a new small company and a good beginning level simulation for those who like to reduce their opponents to so much nuclear dust."

Michael Polling reviewed ICBM for White Dwarf #28, giving it an overall rating of 4 out of 10, and stated that "As a game it is unsatisfactory: claiming victory is academic when your country has been wiped out. And for US buyers it may well have the effect of endorsing Reagan's arms build-up, encouraging players unknowingly to support escalation."

References

Board games introduced in 1981
Mayfair Games games